Barbey may refer to:

Places 
 Barbey, Seine-et-Marne, a commune in France

People 
 Aron K. Barbey (born 1977), American neuroscientist
 Bruno Barbey (born 1941), French photographer
 Daniel E. Barbey (1889–1969), United States Navy officer
 Jules Amédée Barbey d'Aurevilly (1808–1889), French novelist
 Peter Barbey (born 1957/8), American publisher
 William Barbey (1842-1914), Swiss botanist and politician

See also
 Barbee (disambiguation)
 Barbie (disambiguation)
 Barbi (disambiguation)
 Barby (disambiguation)
 Barbe (disambiguation)